The 2006 Canada rugby union tour of Europe was a series of matches played in November 2006 in Wales and Italy by Canada national rugby union team.

Results

References
 
 

Canada
tour
Canada national rugby union team tours
tour
tour
Rugby union tours of Wales
Rugby union tours of Italy